Levi Baker Vilas (February 25, 1811February 6, 1879) was an American lawyer and politician. He was the 4th Mayor of Madison, Wisconsin, and served three non-consecutive years in the Wisconsin State Assembly, representing Dane County.  Before moving to Wisconsin, he served in the Vermont Senate and House of Representatives.

Biography
Vilas was born in Randolph, Vermont, the son of Mercy (Flint) and Moses Vilas. Vilas was admitted to the Vermont bar in 1833, and practiced law. He was a member of the 1835 Vermont Constitutional Convention. In 1836, he served in the Vermont House of Representatives while living in and in 1840 was elected to the Vermont State Senate. He was also elected probate judge and was the Democratic nominee for the 1848 United States Senate election in Vermont, losing to incumbent Whig Senator William Upham.

In 1851, Vilas and his family moved to Madison, Wisconsin. There, Vilas was elected Mayor of the city. He started a law practice in Wisconsin from which the present day law firm of Bell, Moore & Richter, S.C. draws its roots. Vilas also served in the Wisconsin State Assembly in 1855, 1868, and 1873. During the American Civil War, Vilas was a draft commissioner. He was one of the regents of the University of Wisconsin System and the Wisconsin Historical Society. His son was William Freeman Vilas, who served as United States Postmaster General and in the United States Senate.

His former home in Madison is located in what is now the Langdon Street Historic District.

Notes

Vermont state court judges
Members of the Vermont House of Representatives
Vermont state senators
Members of the Wisconsin State Assembly
Mayors of Madison, Wisconsin
People from Randolph, Vermont
People of Wisconsin in the American Civil War
1811 births
1879 deaths
19th-century American politicians
19th-century American judges